Dr. John Ekuru Longoggy Aukot (born c. 1972) is a Kenyan lawyer and politician. He was a third tier candidate in the 2017 Kenyan general election.

Dr. Aukot Sponsored a Bill to amend the Kenya Constitution popularly known as Punguza mzigo Bill through a popular initiative, managed to garner 1.2 Million signatures and approved By IEBC to proceed to county assemblies for debate.

The high court in Kenya, allowed the Punguza Mzigo Bill sponsored by Thirdway alliance to proceed in the 47 County Assemblies for debate.

References

Living people
1970s births
Alumni of the University of Warwick
20th-century Kenyan lawyers
Candidates for President of Kenya